Meherdates ( Mihrdāt) was a Parthian prince who competed against Gotarzes II for the Parthian crown from 49 to 51 AD. A son of Vonones I, he was ultimately defeated and captured by Gotarzes II, who spared him, but had his ears mutilated, an act that disqualified him from inheriting the throne.

References

Sources 
 
 
  

1st-century Parthian monarchs
1st-century deaths
Year of birth unknown
1st-century Iranian people